Scolopsis affinis, or Peters' monocle bream, is a fish native to the Indian and Pacific Oceans.

Fish performs behaviour of mobbing the Bobbit worm. The fish swims to the entrance of the worm's burrow, positions itself nearly vertically face-down above it, and blows sharp jets of water in the Bobbit's direction.

References

External links
 Fishes of Australia : Scolopsis affinis
 

affinis
Marine fish of Northern Australia
Fish described in 1877